Pietrosu is a commune in Făleşti District, Moldova. It is composed of three villages: Măgura, Măgura Nouă and Pietrosu.

References

Communes of Fălești District